Elise Madeline LeGrow (born June 4, 1987) is a Canadian recording artist and songwriter.

Elise was offered a publishing deal from Sony/ATV Music Publishing following a live performance at the 2009 NXNE music festival in Toronto.

Elise's first release, "No Good Woman," was the most added single on adult contemporary radio in Canada the week of April 7, 2012. The single peaked at number six on the Nielsen BDS Adult Contemporary chart, and remained in the top 10 for 13 weeks.

In 2016, Elise signed with Awesome Music in Canada, which brought on S-Curve/BMG as her label in the US. Later in 2016, she recorded a full-length concept album of Chess Records covers entitled Playing Chess. The album was produced by Steve Greenberg, Michael Mangini and Betty Wright. Questlove and Captain Kirk Douglas as well as The Dap Kings made contributions to the record.

Elise released "You Never Can Tell," by Chuck Berry as her first single from the record on May 19, 2017. In June 2016, she released "Who Do You Love", debuted at #15 on the CBC Radio 2 chart and eventually hit Top 10 on the CBC Radio 2 chart.

Elise LeGrow released her debut album Playing Chess on February 16, 2018.
Elise LeGrow released the single Evan on July 17, 2020, and in 2021 released a second album, Grateful.

In April 2022, Elise LeGrow was featured on "Temptation" by DJ Bakermat, the first record on his label Big Top Amsterdam.

References

External links
 
 

1987 births
Canadian singer-songwriters
Living people
LeGrow, Elise
21st-century Canadian women singers